Celtnieks Stadium is a multi-purpose stadium in Daugavpils, Latvia. It is currently used mostly for football matches and is the home stadium of FC Daugava. The stadium has capacity for 1,980 people.

References

Daugavpils
Football venues in Latvia
Multi-purpose stadiums in Latvia